The 2010 Australian Formula Ford Championship was a CAMS sanctioned national motor racing title for drivers of Formula Ford open wheel racing cars. It was the 41st national series for Formula Fords to be held in Australia and the 18th to carry the Australian Formula Ford Championship name. The championship, which was promoted as the "2010 Genuine Ford Parts Australian Formula Ford Championship", began on 26 March 2010 at the Albert Park Street Circuit and ended on 21 November at Sandown Raceway after eight rounds. Australian Formula Ford Management Pty. Ltd. was appointed by CAMS as the Category Manager for the Championship.

Synergy Motorsport Spectrum driver Chaz Mostert won the title with a dominant season performance. The Queensland driver secured the title at Round 7 and won a total of five rounds during the series. Individual race wins were achieved by Mostert (14), Nick Foster (3), Ashley Walsh (2), Ryan Simpson (2) and Geoff Uhrhane (1).

Teams and drivers
The following teams and drivers competed in the championship. All teams and drivers were Australian-registered, excepting New Zealanders Nick Cassidy, Martin Short and Ben Barker, who was British-registered.  

Note: All cars were powered by 1600cc Ford Duratec engines, as mandated by the championship regulations.

Calendar

Note: Rounds were contested over three races, with the exception of Round 1 which was staged over two races.

Points
Championship points were awarded on a 20–16–14–12–10–8–6–4–2–1 basis to the top ten classified finishers in each race. An additional point was awarded to the driver gaining pole position for the first race at each round.

Results

Note: Race 2 at the Albert Park Street Circuit, was stopped due to a serious crash on lap 2 involving Caleb Rayner. The race was abandoned and no championship points were awarded.

References

External links
 Official Australian Formula Ford website
 2010 Racing Results Archive

Australian Formula Ford Championship seasons
Formula Ford Championship